The 2013 Meath Senior Football Championship is the 121st edition of the Meath GAA's premier club Gaelic football tournament for senior graded teams in County Meath, Ireland, and also the 60th anniversary of the first use of the Keegan Cup, won by Navan O'Mahonys first in 1954. The tournament consists of 18 teams, with the winner going on to represent Meath in the Leinster Senior Club Football Championship. The championship starts with a group stage and then progresses to a knock out stage.

Navan O'Mahonys were the defending champions after they defeated Wolfe Tones in the previous years final, but were knocked out by Summerhill at the quarter-final stage.

This was Na Fianna's first year ever in the senior grade after claiming the 2012 Meath Intermediate Football Championship title.

Nobber were relegated after 3 years as a senior club. Nobber appealed to the Leinster Council after their match with Oldcastle on the basis that the Meath County Board chose them to play Dunshaughlin first after Nobber drew with Oldcastle, even though the loser of the game was meant to play Dunshaughlin next. When Dunshaughlin defeated Nobber, this left Dunshaughlin safe from relegation with nothing to play for against Oldcastle and hence, were defeated. On 30 September, the Leinster Council rejected Nobber's appeal and they lost their senior status.

On 20 October 2013, Summerhill GFC claimed their 7th Senior Championship title, when defeating Na Fianna 1-13 to 1-10 in Pairc Tailteann, Navan. The match was broadcast live on Irish television station TG4. Brian Ennis raised the Keegan Cup for Summerhill while Conor Gillespie claimed the 'Man of the Match' award.
 
The draw for the group stages of the championship were made on 11 February 2013 with the games commencing on the weekend of 12 April 2013.

Team Changes
The following teams have changed division since the 2012 championship season.

To S.F.C.
Promoted from I.F.C.
 Na Fianna  -  (Intermediate Champions)

Participating Teams
The teams taking part in the 2013 Meath Senior Football Championship are:

Group stage
There are 3 groups called Group A,B and C. The 2 top finishers in each group and the third-place finisher in Group A will qualify for the Quarter Finals. The third placed teams in Group B and C will qualify for a Preliminary Quarter Final, with the winner earning a place in last eight. The bottom finishers of each group will qualify for the Relegation Play Off. The draw for the group stages of the championship were made on 11 February 2013 with the games commencing on the weekend of 12 April 2013.

Group A

Round 1
 Nobber             0-8, 3-7  Walterstown,      Rathkenny,    14/4/2013,
 Duleek/Bellewstown 0-7, 0-7     Seneschalstown,      Walterstown,  14/4/2013,
 Moynalvey          0-5, 0-15   Navan O'Mahonys,     Skryne,       19/4/2013,

Round 2
 Walterstown        2-5, 0-11   Duleek/Bellewstown,  Ashbourne,     21/4/2013,
 Seneschalstown  0-16, 0-11  Moynalvey,           Walterstown,   25/4/2013,
 Navan O'Mahonys    1-11, 1-3   Nobber,           Castletown,     3/5/2013,

Round 3
 Navan O'Mahonys    1-15, 0-8   Duleek/Bellewstown,          Seneschalstown, 30/5/2013,
 Walterstown        1-7, 1-14   Seneschalstown,              Dunsany,         1/6/2013,
 Nobber             0-7, 1-11   Moynalvey,                   Walterstown,    2/6/2013,

Round 4
 Duleek/Bellewstown 3-10, 0-9   Nobber,                      Castletown,    16/8/2013,
 Seneschalstown 0-5, 0-10   Navan O'Mahonys,                 Stamullen,     18/8/2013,
 Moynalvey   1-12, 0-8   Walterstown,                        Ashbourne,        27/8/2013,

Round 5
 Moynalvey       2-13, 1-6   Duleek/Bellewstown,             Dunshaughlin,         31/8/2013,
 Nobber             0-8, 5-14   Seneschalstown,              Carlanstown,          31/8/2013,
 Navan O'Mahonys 4-21, 1-6   Walterstown,                    Pairc Tailteann,  31/8/2013.

Group B

Round 1
 St. Patrick's      1-11, 1-8  Donaghmore/Ashbourne, Pairc Tailteann, 13/4/2013,
 Skryne             2-8, 1-10  Summerhill,           Bohermeen,           14/4/2013,
 Rathkenny          1-7, 0-4   Oldcastle,            Kilmainhamwood,      14/4/2013,

Round 2
 Donaghmore/Ashbourne  3-13, 1-8  Skryne,               Ratoath,             20/4/2013,
 Summerhill            0-15, 1-13  Rathkenny,           Pairc Tailteann, 21/4/2013,
 Oldcastle             2-3, 1-8  St. Patrick's,        Simonstown,           3/5/2013,

Round 3
 Donaghmore/Ashbourne  1-10, 1-12 Rathkenny,           Simonstown,           30/5/2013,
 Skryne             0-11, 1-6  St. Patrick's,          Ashbourne,            31/5/2013,
 Summerhill            1-11, 0-9  Oldcastle,           Athboy,               31/5/2013 

Round 4
 Oldcastle          0-6, 2-18  Donaghmore/Ashbourne,   Simonstown,           16/8/2013,
 Rathkenny             0-12,   2-6   Skryne,                 Dunshaughlin,         16/8/2013,
 St. Patrick's         1-4, 1-13  Summerhill,          Walterstown,          17/8/2013,

Round 5
 Donaghmore/Ashbourne  0-10, 0-11  Summerhill,         Pairc Tailteann,  30/8/2013,
 Skryne             2-20, 0-9      Oldcastle,             Simonstown,           30/8/2013,
 St. Patrick's      1-10, 1-6   Rathkenny,             Ashbourne,            30/8/2013.

Group C

Round 1
 Simonstown Gaels      1-9, 0-17  Dunshaughlin,         Pairc Tailteann, 12/4/2013,
 Na Fianna             2-10, 1-11  St. Peter's Dunboyne, Pairc Tailteann, 14/4/2013,
 Wolfe Tones            2-6, 0-10  Blackhall Gaels,      Pairc Tailteann, 20/4/2013,

Round 2
 St. Peter's Dunboyne  2-7, 0-11  Simonstown Gaels,     Dunderry,            20/4/2013,
 Blackhall Gaels      1-12, 0-12  Na Fianna,            Summerhill,           26/4/2013,
 Dunshaughlin          1-11, 1-14  Wolfe Tones,         Skryne,               2/5/2013,

Round 3
 Blackhall Gaels       1-5, 0-14 St. Peter's Dunboyne,        Summerhill,    30/5/2013,
 Wolfe Tones           2-5, 1-17  Simonstown Gaels,                Brew's Hill,         31/5/2013,
 Dunshaughlin          0-9, 3-12  Na Fianna,                       Trim,                 1/6/2013,

Round 4
 Na Fianna          1-10, 0-11  Wolfe Tones,                       Trim,                 17/8/2013,
 Simonstown Gaels   0-15, 0-10  Blackhall Gaels,                   Bohermeen,            18/8/2013,
 St. Peter's Dunboyne 1-11, 0-15   Dunshaughlin,                   Dunsany,              18/8/2013,

Round 5
 Dunshaughlin          0-8, 4-7    Blackhall Gaels,                Pairc Tailteann,  1/9/2013,
 Wolfe Tones        2-9, 1-11   St. Peter's Dunboyne,              Ashbourne,            1/9/2013,
 Simonstown Gaels      1-15, 5-13  Na Fianna,                      Trim,                 1/9/2013.

Knock-out Stages

Relegation Play Off
The three bottom finishers from each group qualify for the relegation play off and play each other in a round robin basis.
The team with the worst record after two matches will be relegated to the 2014 Intermediate Championship.

 Game 1: Nobber         1-10, 1-10    Oldcastle,          Kilmainham,    14/9/2013,
 Game 2: Nobber         1-9, 1-11  Dunshaughlin,    Brews Hill,    21/9/2013,
 Game 3: Dunshaughlin   0-11, 0-12 Oldcastle,       Simonstown,    28/9/2013,

Finals
The winners and runners up of each group qualify for the quarter finals along with the third-placed finisher of Group A.

Preliminary Quarter-Final:
 Summerhill     3-14, 2-11   St. Peter's Dunboyne,     Ashbourne,             8/9/2013,

Quarter-Final:
 Skryne            3-10, 3-12   Wolfe Tones,          Pairc Tailteann,   13/9/2013,
 Na Fianna      7-10, 2-10   Moynalvey,               Pairc Tailteann,   14/9/2013,
 Rathkenny      0-14, 1-10   Seneschalstown,          Pairc Tailteann,   15/9/2013, (A.E.T.) 
 Navan O'Mahonys   1-8,  1-9    Summerhill,           Trim,                  15/9/2013,

Semi-Final:  
 Wolfe Tones       1-12, 2-19   Na Fianna,            Pairc Tailteann,  27/9/2013,
 Summerhill     0-15, 1-7    Rathkenny,             Pairc Tailteann,  29/9/2013,

Final:
 Na Fianna         1-10, 1-13   Summerhill,         Pairc Tailteann,  20/10/2013,

Leinster Senior Club Football Championship

Quarter Final:
 Newtown Blues 1-13, 2-13 Summerhill, Drogheda Park, 10/11/2013,

Semi-Final:
 St. Vincent's 1-14, 1-10 Summerhill, Parnell Park, 24/11/2013,

References

External links

Meath Senior Football Championship
Meath Senior Football Championship